Petra Kammerevert (born 1 June 1966) is a German politician who has been serving as Member of the European Parliament (MEP) since 2009. She is a member of the Social Democratic Party of Germany, part of the Party of European Socialists.

Education and professional experience 
Following her Abitur in Düsseldorf in 1985, Kammerevert studied sociology and political science at the University of Duisburg-Essen, graduating with a degree in Social Sciences. Between 1992 and 2002, she worked as a scientific adviser to a Member of the European Parliament, spending the first eighteen months in Brussels and the remainder in Düsseldorf. From 2002 to 2009 she worked as a consultant for the ARD public service broadcasting company.

Political career 
Kammerevert joined the Social Democratic Party of Germany in 1984 and initially participated as a board member of the Young Socialists in the SPD's Lower Rhine regional group between 1987 and 1990. In 1992 she assumed the chair of the Young Socialists in the SPD Düsseldorf, an office which she retained until 1995. Since 1997, she has been a member of the executive committee of the SPD Düsseldorf. Between 1999 and 2009, she was a member of the municipal council of Düsseldorf. Since 2004, she has also been a member of the executive committee of the SPD Lower Rhine region. Since 2012, Kammerevert has been a member of the SPD leadership in North Rhine-Westphalia under chairwoman Hannelore Kraft.

Member of the European Parliament, 2009–present 
In the 2009 European Parliament election, Kammerevert was elected as a Member of the European Parliament on the Social Democratic Party of Germany list for  North Rhine-Westphalia. As such, she sits in the Progressive Alliance of Socialists and Democrats parliamentary group. Her "constituency" comprises Düsseldorf, Krefeld, Mettmann, Mönchengladbach, Neuss, Remscheid, Solingen and Wuppertal.

In the European Parliament, she works as a member of the Committee on Culture and Education, which is also responsible for media, information, youth and sports policy. She served as her parliamentary group's coordinator on the committee from 2014 until 2017 and as its chairwoman from 2017 until 2019. Alongside Sabine Verheyen, Kammerevert was selected in 2016 as co-rapporteurs on the audio-visual media services directive, which seeks to introduce levies and cultural quotas on services like Netflix.

In addition to her committee assignments, Kammerevert is substitute member of the Committee on Transport and Tourism and of the EU-Croatia Joint Parliamentary Committee. She is also a member of the Transatlantic Legislators' Dialogue (TLD), and the European Parliament Intergroup on the Digital Agenda. On the national level, she is a member of the executive committee of the SPD's commission on media.

Other activities
 Westdeutscher Rundfunk (WDR), Member of the Broadcasting Council (since 2009)
 Fortuna Düsseldorf, Member
 Düsseldorfer EG, Member

Personal life 
Kammerevert is married and, together with one adult stepson, lives in Düsseldorf.

References

External links 
 
 European Parliament biography

1966 births
Living people
People from Duisburg
Social Democratic Party of Germany MEPs
MEPs for Germany 2009–2014
MEPs for Germany 2014–2019
MEPs for Germany 2019–2024
University of Duisburg-Essen alumni